Jacksboro is the name of two places in the United States:

Jacksboro, Tennessee
Jacksboro, Texas